Mes Kerman is an Iranian UCI Continental cycling team established in 2007. The team disbanded after the 2012 season, and re-formed in 2018.

Team roster

References

External links

UCI Continental Teams (Asia)
Cycling teams established in 2018
Cycling teams established in 2007
Cycling teams disestablished in 2012
Cycling teams based in Iran